Goran "Goki" Radaković (: born 11 July 1964) is a Serbian actor. He appeared in more than fifty films since 1978.

Selected filmography

References

External links 

1964 births
Living people
Male actors from Belgrade
Serbian male film actors
20th-century Serbian male actors
21st-century Serbian male actors